Pfaffenweiler (High Alemannic: Pfaffewiiler) is a municipality in the district of Breisgau-Hochschwarzwald in Baden-Württemberg in southern Germany. Around 1850, over 200 inhabitants of Pfaffenweiler emigrated to the United States, and settled in Jasper, Indiana. Pfaffenweiler maintains a partnership with Jasper, as a part of which students are exchanged and several formal and informal visits are made.

References

Breisgau-Hochschwarzwald
Baden